Markus Grössinger (born 1 August 1989) is an Austrian footballer who played in the Bundesliga for SV Ried.

External links
 

1989 births
Living people
Austrian footballers
SV Grödig players
SV Ried players
Austrian Football Bundesliga players

Association football midfielders